Club Deportivo Juventud Candelareño  is a Salvadoran professional football club based in Chalchuapa (Candelaria La Frontera), Santa Ana, El Salvador.

The club currently plays in the Tercera Division de Fútbol Salvadoreño.

The club was founded in 1982

References

External links
 Juventud Candelareño toma ritmo (Tercera División)

Football clubs in El Salvador